George Gush (as of 1980) was the head of the history section of West Kent College's "Social and Academic Studies Department", and is now retired. He is most notable for his work on wargaming.

He is the founder of the Tunbridge Wells Wargames Society and was its chairman until 2007. In its early days the society had met at George Gush's house.

Writings by George Gush 
 Renaissance Armies 1480 - 1650  Patrick Stephens, 1975. 
 A Guide to Wargaming with Andrew Finch, 1980.

See also 
 Don Featherstone
 Charles Grant

References 

British historians
Miniature wargames
Living people
Year of birth missing (living people)